Rectory Road is a London Overground station on the Lea Valley lines in the West Hackney area of the London Borough of Hackney, east London. 

Its three-letter station code is REC and it is in Travelcard zone 2.

Trains run south to Liverpool Street and north to either Cheshunt or Enfield Town.

The ticket office, street buildings, staircases and platform shelters were all built in the mid-1980s in works funded by the Greater London Council (along with other stations in the "Tube-less" borough of Hackney). These elaborate structures were very different from the low-maintenance changes further up the line at the same time, and feature the British Rail logo worked into the brickwork at street-level.

In 2015 the station and all services that call there were transferred from Abellio Greater Anglia operation to London Overground. The station was also added to the Tube map.

Services
Trains are operated by London Overground.

The typical off-peak weekday service pattern from Rectory Road is:

Connections
London Buses routes 67, 76, 149, 243 and 276 serve the station.

References

External links

Railway stations in the London Borough of Hackney
Former Great Eastern Railway stations
Railway stations in Great Britain opened in 1872
Railway stations served by London Overground